Currie Street is a main street in the Adelaide city centre, South Australia. It runs east–to–west from King William Street, through Light Square, to West Terrace on the western edge of the city centre.

History

The street was named after British MP Raikes Currie (1801–1881), a founder of the South Australian Company and treasurer of the South Australian Church Society. The street was named after Currie by the Street Naming Committee in 1837.

English benefactor William Augustine Leigh (1802–1873), who bought many parcels of land in South Australia through his agent Sir John Morphett, bought two town acres between Currie and Hindley Streets. Hence the naming of Leigh Street, a now pedestrianised street between the two, and a popular dining area.

Thomas Topham Petheridge, of Plymouth, was a land grantee of Town acre 138 on Currie Street's south side, and of Town acre 176 on Waymouth Street's north side. Topham Street, now closed, which ran between Currie and Waymouth Streets over the land granted to Petheridge, was named eponymously. The street is now the site of Topham Mall.

The Currie Street Model School, one of four "model schools" in the city centre, was established in 1893.

In July 2012, bus lanes were introduced along the full length of Currie Street.

Continuing east and west

Glover Avenue
The street changes its name to Glover Avenue at West Terrace. It continues west through the Adelaide Park Lands and Bakewell Underpass. Glover Avenue was opened in 1925 and was named after the previous Lord Mayor of Adelaide, Charles Richmond Glover. The Bakewell underpass opened in 2008. It replaced the Bakewell Bridge which opened with Glover Avenue in 1925. The Bakewell Bridge was named after Edward Bakewell, the chairman of the Municipal Tramways Trust.

The purpose of the Bakewell Bridge was to reduce motor vehicle and tram traffic congestion on limited routes between the western suburbs and the Adelaide city centre. Glover Avenue and the Bakewell Bridge replaced a level crossing and Henley Beach Road crossing the parklands on a different alignment. The bridge carried tram and motor traffic over some busy railway lines. The trams were removed in the 1950s.

The bridge continued in use until it was in need of replacement. It was demolished in 2006. The bridge was replaced by the Bakewell Underpass which continued under James Congdon Drive to provide a grade-separated intersection. It opened for traffic in January 2008.

Henley Beach Road
It then changes name to Henley Beach Road as it continues through the western suburbs to the seaside, terminating at Henley Beach South.

Prior to construction of Glover Avenue in 1925, Henley Beach Road did not align to Currie Street. Glover Street veers right (north) from Currie Street. Prior to its construction, Henley Beach Road crossed the railway at a level crossing and continued as Mile End Road straight across the Adelaide Park Lands to align with Hindley Street. The tram line followed North Terrace and the first part of Port Road on the bridge over the railway, then swung south to join Henley Beach Road.

Grenfell Street
On the east side of King William Street, it changes name to Grenfell Street. A common belief for the name change that happens at King William Street with Grenfell/Currie St is that the namers believed no one should be able to cross the King's path. This applies to all streets that meet King William Street.

Notable buildings
The Queen's Theatre, on Playhouse Lane and connected to Currie Street by Gilles Arcade, is the oldest theatre in mainland Australia. Built in 1840, the façade dates from 1850. The building has had a number of uses:
1840-1842 Queen's Theatre & Shakespeare Tavern
1843-1850 Supreme Court & Temple Tavern
1850-1868 Royal Victoria Theatre & Theatre Tavern
1877-1928 Horse and Carriage Bazaar
1928-1988 Car park and light industry

The building is now owned by Arts South Australia. After a partial restoration in the 1990s, is now used as a performance space and function venue.

See also

References

Streets in Adelaide